MPL Communications (which stands for McCartney Productions Ltd.)  (NAICS 512230, SIC 2741) is the umbrella company for the business interests of Paul McCartney and was established in 1969. In addition to handling McCartney's post-Beatles work, MPL is one of the world's largest privately owned music publishers through its acquisition of other publishing companies.

Profile
The company was founded in February 1969 as Adagrove Limited but changed its name to McCartney Productions Ltd. in August 1969. One of the company's first projects was the purchase of the rights to a film adaptation of Rupert Bear in early 1970.

Music publishing
MPL publishing owns a wide range of copyrighted material – covering nearly 100 years of music – by composers including McCartney, Buddy Holly, Carl Perkins, Jerry Herman, Frank Loesser, Meredith Willson, Harold Arlen and many others, with songs, such as "Rock-a-Bye Your Baby with a Dixie Melody" (made famous by Al Jolson), "I'm Glad There Is You", "Blue Suede Shoes", and "That'll Be the Day". Lennon–McCartney songs such as "Love Me Do" and "P.S. I Love You" became part of the catalog in the late 2010s after McCartney reached a settlement with longtime Beatles catalog holder Sony/ATV Music Publishing allowing the co-author to reclaim his songs fifty-six years from their initial publication. MPL also controls 25 subsidiary companies.

In 1976 MPL bought the rights to most of Buddy Holly's compositions, and in 2003 the rights to Carl Perkins' works. The Holly acquisition was followed by McCartney's launch of 'Buddy Holly Day' with a concert presented annually from 1976 to 1999.
Additionally, MPL has acquired rights to other cover songs recorded by the Beatles, and on solo recordings by John Lennon, McCartney, Ringo Starr, and Denny Laine as follows:

Buddy Holly songs 
"Words of Love" (Beatles for Sale, 1964)
"Crying, Waiting, Hoping" (Live at the BBC, 1994)
"That'll Be the Day" (Anthology 1, 1995)
"Peggy Sue" (Lennon's Rock 'n' Roll, 1975, and John Lennon Anthology, 1998)
Denny Laine's album Holly Days (1976)

Carl Perkins songs 
"Everybody's Trying to Be My Baby", (Beatles for Sale, 1964, and Live at the Hollywood Bowl, 2016)
"Honey Don't" (Beatles for Sale, 1964)
"Matchbox" (Long Tall Sally EP, 1964 and Past Masters, 1988)
"Sure to Fall" (Live at the BBC, 1994, and Starr's Stop and Smell the Roses, 1981)
"Blue Suede Shoes" (Anthology 3, 1996, The Beatles: Get Back, 2021, and Lennon's Live Peace in Toronto, 1969)

Other songs 
"Twist and Shout" (Please Please Me, 1963, The Beatles at the Hollywood Bowl, 1977, Anthology 1, 1995, The Beatles: Get Back, 2021)
"Till There Was You" (With the Beatles, 1963, Live at the BBC, 1994, Anthology 1, 1995)
"Ain't She Sweet" (Anthology 1, 1995, Anthology 3, 1996, and the John Lennon Anthology, 1998)
"Hi-Heel Sneakers" (The Beatles: Get Back, 2021, and McCartney's Unplugged (The Official Bootleg), 1991)
"Bluejean Bop" (McCartney's Run Devil Run, 1999)
"Let's Have a Party" aka "Party" (McCartney's Run Devil Run, 1999)
"Sentimental Journey" (Starr's Sentimental Journey, 1970)
"Blue, Turning Grey Over You" (Starr's Sentimental Journey, 1970)
"Blue Christmas" (Starr's I Wanna Be Santa Claus, 1999)
"Carolina Moon" (The Beatles: Get Back, 2021)

Mary McCartney Picture department
McCartney's second eldest daughter, photographer and photo editor Mary McCartney, runs the picture department.

Trademark
In October 2006, the Trademark Registry in London reported that MPL Communications had started a process to trademark McCartney's name on saleable goods.

See also
:Category:Music published by MPL Music Publishing
Calderstone Productions

Notes and references

External links
 

Music publishing companies of the United Kingdom
Paul McCartney
Soho Square
Entertainment companies established in 1969
Mass media companies established in 1969
IFPI members